Charlton is a surname. Notable people with the surname include:

 Alethea Charlton (1931–1976), British actress
 Alex Charlton (born 1980), American politician
 Betty Jo Charlton (1923–2014)), American politician
 Bobby Charlton (born 1937), English footballer
 Brian Charlton (born 1947), Canadian politician
 Chris Charlton (born 1963), Canadian politician
 Conrad Charlton (1888–1976), Australian radio personality
 Daphne Charlton (1909–1991), English artist 
 Dave Charlton (1936–2013), South African Formula One driver
 Eddie Charlton (1929–2004), Australian snooker player
 Edward Colquhoun Charlton (1920–1945), English soldier and recipient of the Victoria Cross
 Evan Charlton (1904–1984), British artist
 Felicity Charlton (1913–2009), British artist
 Hall Charlton (born 1979), English rugby union footballer
 Jack Charlton (1935–2020), English footballer and manager
 James Charlton (disambiguation), multiple people
 John Charlton (disambiguation), multiple people
 Joseph Charlton (born 1997), American football player
 Ken Charlton (basketball) (born 1941), American basketball player
 Lionel Charlton (1879–1958), air commodore, senior RAF commander
 Manny Charlton (1941–2022), guitarist
 Margaret Ridley Charlton (1858–1931), Canadian medical librarian
 Matthew Charlton (1866–1948), Australian politician
 Michael Charlton (born 1927), Australian TV journalist
 Neville Charlton (1928–2014), Australian rugby league footballer
 Norm Charlton (born 1963), American baseball player
 Percie Charlton (1867–1954), Australian cricketer
 R. Charlton (poet/songwriter) (c. 1800), of Tyneside, England
 Richard Charlton (1791–1852), British Consul to Kingdom of Hawaii
 Robert M. Charlton (1807–1854), American politician
 Sam Charlton (born 1991), New Zealand field hockey player
 Simon Charlton (born 1971), English footballer
 Stan Charlton (born 1929), English footballer with Arsenal and Leyton Orient
 Stan Charlton Sr. (born 1900), English footballer with Exeter City and Crystal Palace
 Suzanne Charlton (born 1962), BBC Weather forecaster
 Taco Charlton (born 1994), American football player
 Thomas Charlton (disambiguation), multiple people
 Tony Charlton (1929–2012), Australian TV sportscaster
 William Charlton (disambiguation), multiple people

See also
 Charlton (given name)
 Charlton (disambiguation)
 Charleton
 Charleston (disambiguation)

English-language surnames